Miss Centre-Val de Loire is a French beauty pageant which selects a representative for the Miss France national competition from the region of Centre-Val de Loire. Women representing the region under various different titles have competed at Miss France since 1928, although the Miss Centre-Val de Loire title was not used regularly until 2015.

The current Miss Centre-Val de Loire is Jade Lange, who was crowned Miss Centre-Val de Loire 2021 on 24 October 2021, and reinherited the title on 23 December 2022, following the resignation of Coraline Lerasle as Miss Centre-Val de Loire 2022. One woman from Centre-Val de Loire has been crowned Miss France:
Flora Coquerel, who was crowned Miss France 2014, competing as Miss Orléanais

Results summary
Miss France: Flora Coquerel (2013; Miss Orléanais)
2nd Runner-Up: Karine Richefeu (1989); Amélie Rudler (1998; Miss Berry)
4th Runner-Up: Annie Fraile (1970; Miss Touraine)
5th Runner-Up: Sandrine Pétoin (1994; Miss Berry); Élodie Thomas (2005; Miss Berry); Cassandre Rolland (2009; Miss Orléanais)
Top 12/Top 15: Stéphanie Sabourin (1993; Miss Orléanais); Ludivine Julio (1995; Miss Touraine-Sologne); Barbara Niewidziala (1996; Miss Berry); Bérengère Clément (1998; Miss Touraine-Sologne); Anne-Sophie Masson (2003; Miss Berry); Nadège Dabrowski (2006; Miss Berry-Val de Loire); Aline Moreau (2008; Miss Berry-Val de Loire); Chanel Haye (2010; Miss Orléanais); Amanda Xeres (2014); Margaux Bourdin (2015); Jade Simon-Abadie (2019)

Titleholders
The regional title has been known as Miss Centre-Val de Loire since 2015, while from 2010 to 2014, it was known as Miss Centre. 

From 1976 to 1992, the title was called Miss Centre-Ouest.

Miss Berry
From 1994 to 2005, the departments of Cher and Indre competed separately under the title Miss Berry. From 2006 to 2009, the title was known as Miss Berry Val de Loire.

Miss Indre
In 1970, the department of Indre crowned its own representative for Miss France.

Miss Loir-et-Cher
In 1979, the department of Loir-et-Cher crowned its own representative for Miss France.

Miss Orléanais
From 1993 to 2014, the departments of Eure-et-Loir, Loir-et-Cher, and Loiret competed separately under the title Miss Orléanais. In 1976 and 1977, the title was called Miss Orléans and represented just Loiret.

Miss Sologne-Val de Loire
From 2000 to 2002, the departments of Cher, Loir-et-Cher, and Loiret competed separately under the title Miss Sologne-Val de Loire.

Miss Touraine
In the 1970s, 1980s, and 2000s, the departments of Indre and Indre-et-Loire competed separately under the title Miss Touraine.

Miss Touraine-Sologne
From 1995 to 1999, the region crowned a representative under the title Miss Touraine-Sologne.

Miss Tours
In 1970, the department of Indre-et-Loire competed separately under the title Miss Tours.

Notes

References

External links

Miss France regional pageants
Beauty pageants in France
Women in France